To Revolution Square is the name of a documentary short film directed by Iranian filmmaker Hossein Rajabian.

Synopsis 
It portrays the commute of the common people in the Iranian capital city of Tehran who have to take the bus to go to Revolution Square on a daily basis. During the movie, people come to listen to strange radio news while they are on the bus. They don't react particularly to the unbelievable reports, though, and are incredibly detached.

References

External links 
 Hossein Rajabian Official Website
 washington post
 International Film Festival Clermont
 Culture action europe
 International Film Festival Clermont
 The 10 Best Iranian Films of 2015

Documentary films about Iran
Persian-language films
Iranian documentary films